Vamps is a comic book limited series by Elaine Lee and William Simpson published in 1994 to 1995. Two sequels series, Vamps: Hollywood and Vein and Vamps: Pumpkin Time, were also released.

Contents
Vamps tells the story of five modern-day female vampires, all created as 'brides', and begins with the group deciding that they've had enough of being treated as slaves and lackeys.

Reception
Andy Butcher reviewed the Vamps graphic novel for Arcane magazine, rating it an 8 out of 10 overall. Butcher comments that "this is a well-crafted story, with some interesting new takes on one of our most popular myths. It's well worth a read".

References

Comic book limited series